"Disco" Dave Hillyard is a tenor saxophonist originating from San Diego, California.  He has performed in groups such as The Slackers, The Rocksteady Seven, The Donkey Show, Hepcat, Stubborn All-Stars, and has guested with the likes of Rancid, Victor Rice, Skinnerbox NYC and Alexandra Lawerentz.  He is a skilled improviser and composer/arranger with more than thirty album credits to his name.

Biography
Tenor and soprano saxophonist David Hillyard is one of the innovators of the American ska scene and is at the forefront of the jazz and reggae scene. The talented musician-arranger-composer has been instrumental in creating and re-popularizing the sound of "Jamaican Rock n Roll" and "Ska Jazz" and has been a professional musician for over 30 years.

At 17 years old, Hillyard played with The Donkey Show, one of California’s pioneering ska bands. He also played with Hepcat, which went on to become one of the biggest ska acts of the 1990s. He has also performed with ska groups like the Stubborn All-Stars, reggae artists like Cornell Campbell, Congo ‘Ashanti’ Roy and Johnny Osbourne, jazz artists like Roy Campbell, Jr., blues artists like Simon Chardiet, and even soul singers like Archie Bell, although he is best known for his work with the Slackers beginning in 1991. He continues to be a key member of that organization and has appeared on their 10 cd releases and thousands of live gigs, currently averaging about 120-150 gigs a year in the USA, Canada, Japan, Latin America and Europe.

Discography

With The Rocksteady Seven
Playtime - (1999), Hellcat Records
United Front - (2003), Do Tell Records
Way out East: Live at The Kassablanca - (2007), Brixton Records
Get Back Up! - (2009), Brixton Records
The Giver - (2018), ORG Music
Plague Doctor - (2022), ORG Music

With Glen Adams
Plays Hits of Jackpot - (2008), Ska In The World, Japan

With The Slackers
Better Late Than Never - (1996), Moon Ska Records
Redlight - (1997), Hellcat Records
The Question - (1998), Hellcat Records
Live at Ernesto's - (2000), Hellcat Records
Wasted Days - (2001), Hellcat Records
The Slackers and Friends - (2002), Special Potatoe Records
Close My Eyes - (2003), Hellcat Records
Upsettin' Ernesto's - (2004), Music Machine Records
International War Criminal - (2004), Thought Squad Records
The Slackers/Pulley Split - (2004), Do Tell Records
An Afternoon in Dub - (2005)
Slack in Japan - (2005)
Slackness - (2005), Ska In The World Records
Peculiar - (2006), Hellcat Records
Big Tunes! Hits & Misses from 1996 to 2006 - (2007), Disk Union Records
The Boss Harmony Sessions (2007)
Self Medication (2008) 
The Great Rocksteady Swindle (2010)
The Slackers (2016), Brainlab Groove

With Hepcat
Out of Nowhere - (1993), Moon Ska Records

With Stubborn All-Stars
Open Season - (1995), Stubborn Records
Back With A New Batch - (1997), Stubborn Records

With The Donkey Show
Bali Island - (1988)
The Ska Parade: Runnin' Naked Thru The Cornfield - (1997)
Just Can't Get Enough Of... — (2000)

References

External links 
"03 – DAVE HILLYARD – CONVERSATIONS ON A REVIVALIST MOVEMENT", Ska Blah Blah
"Ska History Month: Interview with Dave Hillyard", Music is our Occupation, April 7, 2008
 MySpace Profile: David Hillyard & The Rocksteady 7
 [ Allmusic Biography Entry]

Year of birth missing (living people)
Living people
Hellcat Records artists
American ska saxophonists
American jazz saxophonists
American male saxophonists
Musicians from San Diego
21st-century American saxophonists
Jazz musicians from California
21st-century American male musicians
American male jazz musicians
The Slackers members